The Adamson Soaring Falcons are the collegiate men's varsity teams of Adamson University that play in the University Athletic Association of the Philippines which is the mother sports league of the Falcons. The collegiate women's varsity teams are called the Lady Falcons while the high school varsity teams are called the Baby Falcons and Lady Baby Falcons.

The University's varsity teams also participate in other sports leagues such as the Filoil Flying V Preseason Cup, Fr. Martin's Cup, University Games, and Premier Volleyball League.

Team mascot and colors
The school's choice of the falcon as its mascot is symbolic. Just as the falcon soars high before inflicting harm on its prey, so do the varsity teams of Adamson soar high to defeat their opponents in a sporting event.

Blue (navy blue) and White are Adamson's official school color.

Varsity team monikers

Increasing participation
The mother sports league of the Adamson Falcons is the UAAP, which has tournaments in fifteen sports. Adamson does not participate in all fifteen sports or all divisions of a sport. The school authorities are now addressing this. They have set as a goal the full participation of the school in all tournaments of the UAAP.

In Season 76 (2013–14), Adamson University fielded high school team in the UAAP girls' division. This high school girls' team participates in the sport of volleyball and is called the Lady Baby Falcons. Also, in Season 76, Adamson fielded teams in the swimming tournament's men's and women's divisions. Then, in Season 77 (2014–15), Adamson fielded a football team in the men's division. In Season 79 (2016–17), Adamson fielded a team for the first time in a volleyball tournament. More teams will be fielded shortly to achieve the goal of full participation.

Team sports

Basketball

Men's team 
The current Falcon men's basketball team roster for the UAAP Season 85.

List of recent Head Coaches of Men's Basketball Seniors Division 
 Luigi Trillo (1999-2004)
 Mel Alas (2005)
 Leo Austria (2006)
 Bogs Adornado (2007)
 Leo Austria (2008-2013)
 Kenneth Duremdes (2014-2015)
 Michael A. Fermin (2015)
 Franz Pumaren (2015–2021)

Women's team 
The current Falcon women's basketball team roster for the UAAP Season 85.

Championships 

The Adamson Soaring Falcons won one UAAP men's basketball championship on Season 40 (1977-78).
The Adamson Soaring Falcons won the championship of the 2003 University Games.
The Adamson Lady Falcons has won back-to-back women's basketball championships twice, 2003-2004 and 2009-2010.

Notable players 
Men's Basketball
 Hector Calma (won the team during UAAP Season 40)
 Marlou Aquino
 Kenneth Duremdes 
 Gherome Ejercito
 Eddie Laure
 Ken Bono UAAP MVP 2006 / UAAP Mythical First Team
 Lester Alvarez
 Rodney Brondial
 Jericho Cruz
 Alexander Nuyles UAAP Season 74 Mythical Five 
 Celedonio Trollano
 Eric Camson
 Richard Alonzo
 Edward Joseph Feihl
 Jansen Rios
 Louie Alas
 Jerrick Ahanmisi UAAP Mythical Team 2018
 Simon Camacho
 Sean Manganti
 Keith Zaldivar

Women's Basketball
 Ewon Arayi UAAP MVP 2004

Beach volleyball
The school has men's and women's beach volleyball teams.

Volleyball

Notable athletes 
 Angela Benting
 Mylene Paat
 Tatan Pantone 
 Shiela Marie Pineda 
 Pau Soriano
 Jema Galanza
 Trisha Genesis

Rankings
This is the school's ranking in the team sports in UAAP since 1986, the year the UAAP became an eight member-school league.
 

Note: 
1. The rankings from 2003-2005 consider the forfeited games of DLSU. UAAP Season 68 suspension of De La Salle University-Manila.
2. NT: No Tournament held due to pandemic.
3. C: Cancelled due to pandemic.

Number of championships
The following table shows the number of championships of Adamson University in the  University Athletic Association of the Philippines (UAAP).

References

Adamson University
College sports teams in Metro Manila
University Athletic Association of the Philippines teams